HBA/Hirsch Bedner Associates is an American international hospitality design firm established in 1965 in Santa Monica, California and now headquartered in Singapore. HBA is the largest hospitality design firm in the world.

History 

The partnership of Howard Hirsch and Michael Bedner began when Howard hired Michael as an entry-level blueprint drafter. They soon founded the company in 1965, becoming one of the first companies to market themselves as a hospitality design firm. Initially focusing their work on projects local to the United States, HBA began work on the Beverly Rodeo Hotel in Beverly Hills and Chez Voltaire, a restaurant in Florida. Over time, HBA expanded its work internationally, establishing an office in Hong Kong and later an office in London.
After a decrease in revenue between 2008 and 2010, newly appointed co-CEOs Ian Carr and René Kærskov expanded HBA's services by establishing Studio HBA (design services for mid-tier and limited-service hotel projects), HBA Architecture (architectural design services), Light Directions (lighting design consultancy), and Canvas (art budgeting, concept planning, and procurement/installation). Today, the company employs over 1,500 designers and has 22 offices around the globe; Atlanta, Bali, Bangkok, Beijing, Clark, Dubai, Hong Kong, Istanbul, Jakarta, London, Los Angeles, Manila, Miami, Mumbai, New Delhi, San Francisco, Seoul, Shanghai, Singapore, Tokyo, Riyadh and Ho Chi Minh.

Notable Projects

References 

Interior design firms
Architecture firms based in California
Design companies of the United States
Companies based in Santa Monica, California
American companies established in 1965
Design companies established in 1965
1965 establishments in California